Cheryl Frances-Hoad (born 1980) is a British composer.

Early life

Frances-Hoad began composing at the age of eight while studying cello and piano at the Yehudi Menuhin School. She graduated from Gonville and Caius College (Cambridge University) with a Double 1st in 2001 and an MPhil (with Distinction) in Composition, also at Cambridge.

Composer

She has had two ballets choreographed by Lynn Seymour and Geoffrey Cauley; the second was performed by Scottish Ballet in the Britten Theatre, London. Her commissions include works for the BBC, the Surrey Philharmonic, the Manchester International Cello Festival, the Chard Festival of Women in Music, the Bass Club, Bass Fest and the Almeida Festival.

In 2000 the Cambridge Music Festival commissioned a work to commemorate the 250th anniversary of Bach's death, which was performed by the Cambridge University Chamber Orchestra and conducted by Nicholas Daniel. In November 2001 Frances-Hoad had her first chamber opera, broken lines: sonata for opera, premiered by the New Cambridge Opera Group, as part of the Britten@25 Festival, with generous funding from the R.V.W. Trust.

June 2002 saw two premieres: the Spitalfields Festival commission (a work for Nicholas Daniel and the Schubert Ensemble, with funding from the Foyle Foundation), and a piano trio for the London Mozart Trio at the Wigmore Hall. October 2002 saw another premiere at the Wigmore Hall, with a solo cello work for Thomas Carroll and Y.C.A.T, and a commission from the Zurich Chamber Orchestra.

Frances-Hoad was one of six featured composers in Tête à Tête's opera project Family Matters (based on Beaumarchais' third Figaro play The Guilty Mother) with a libretto by Olivier-Award winner Amanda Holden. Workshops took place in Battersea Arts Centre in September 2003, and the final opera was staged throughout February 2004 at the Bridewell Theatre, followed by twelve performances around the country. (The RVW Trust also assisted this venture.) In June 2005, The Glory Tree, a song cycle for the Kreisler Ensemble (inspired by Shamanic rituals and sung entirely in Old English), was premiered in the South Bank's Fresh Series in the Purcell Room.

Prizes and Scholarships

Frances-Hoad has won several prizes, including the Purcell Composition Prize, the Bach Choir Carol Competition, the BBC Young Composers Workshop 1996, the Cambridge Composer's Competition, the Birmingham Conservatoire Composition Competition and the Robert Helps Prize.

She received the Mendelssohn Scholarship in 2002, the Bliss Prize in 2002, and was joint winner of the Harriet Cohen Award in 2002. She has also received awards from Cambridge University, the Newby Trust, the Earls Colne Educational trust and the Sidney Perry Foundation.

In February 2006, after winning the $10,000 Robert Helps Prize with My fleeting Angel (for piano trio), Frances-Hoad became Composer-in-Residence at the University of South Florida for a week, where she gave a two-hour lecture about her work, and a masterclass for both undergraduate and postgraduate composition students.

Albums

The Glory Tree: Chamber Works by Cheryl Frances-Hoad was released on CD by Champs Hill Records in 2011. This is composed of eight works from 1999 to 2008.

References

External links
 Official website

1980 births
English classical composers
Living people
Place of birth missing (living people)
People educated at Yehudi Menuhin School
British women classical composers
20th-century English composers
20th-century classical composers
21st-century English composers
21st-century classical composers
Alumni of Gonville and Caius College, Cambridge
20th-century English women musicians
21st-century English women musicians
20th-century women composers
21st-century women composers